Terry Eliot Tornek (born November 23, 1945) is an American politician who was the mayor of Pasadena, California from 2015 to 2020. He previously served on the Pasadena City Council. On April 21, 2015, he defeated City Councilmember Jacque Robinson in the general election to replace Bill Bogaard, the longest-serving mayor in Pasadena's history.  Tornek is the second longest-serving mayor in Pasadena's history.

Tornek was born to Allen Vernon Tornek and Gertrude Slotkin Tornek in New York City. He was an urban renewal representative with the United States Department of Housing and Urban Development in New York City from 1968 to 1969.

Electoral history

2015

2020

Early life 
On November 23, 1945, Tornek was born in New York City, New York.

Education 
Tornek graduated from Princeton University with a degree in international affairs and from Columbia University with a degree in urban planning.

Career 
In the late 1970s, Tornek's political career started on the city council of Springfield, Massachusetts.

Tornek served in the City of Pasadena planning department from 1982 to 1985, where he was involved in the revitalization of Old Pasadena, which included remodeling historic buildings and transforming it into a tourist destination with eateries and shops. It is now a National Landmark. He also worked in the private sector as a developer and planning director. Tornek was elected to the City Council from the 7th District in 2009 and reelected in 2013.

Tornek served on the Burbank-Glendale-Pasadena Airport Authority, the group that operates Hollywood Burbank Airport, representing Pasadena, as well as on the San Gabriel Valley Council of Governments. He gave his seat to Pasadena council member John Kennedy in 2019.

Personal life 
In 1967, Tornek married Maria. They have three children. In the 1970s, they lived in Massachusetts. In 1982, the Torneks moved to Pasadena. Tornek has seven grandchildren.

References

 
"Gordo Takes Oath as Pasadena Mayor". Pasadena Now. 7 November 2020. Retrieved 8 November 2020.

1945 births
20th-century American Jews
Living people
California Democrats
Politicians from Springfield, Massachusetts
Politicians from New York City
Mayors of Pasadena, California
California city council members
21st-century American politicians
United States Department of Housing and Urban Development officials
21st-century American Jews